1st Marine Surveillance Flotilla, China Marine Surveillance is under North China Sea Branch, State Oceanic Administration and North China Sea Fleet (CMS). Its main task is to administer Chinese waters in Bohai Sea and Yellow Sea. Its headquarters is at Qingdao, Shandong.

References 

State Oceanic Administration
Ministry of Transport of the People's Republic of China